Manor Farm is a   nature reserve in Byfleet in Surrey. It is owned and  managed by the Surrey Wildlife Trust.

This was part of a deer park in the seventeenth century and in the Second World War the wet meadows next to the River Wey were ploughed as part of the Dig for Victory campaign. The site was then a market garden until 2006. The Trust acquired it in 2009 and is restoring it to its natural state.

There is access to footpaths only apart from a dog exercise area.

References

Surrey Wildlife Trust